Claudia Troyo (born June 20, 1977) is a Mexican actress known for her work in soap operas produced by Emilio Larrosa: Amigas y rivales, Las vías del amor, and Hasta que el dinero nos separe. Troyo started her career as an actress with the soap opera La Mentira (The Lie) which was produced by Carlos Sotomayor.

When the producer Emilio Larrosa saw the way she worked he thought she had talent and would achieve many things as a Mexican actress, so he asked her if she could work for him and told her that she would have many opportunities as a famous actress. She accepted and started with him with the soap opera Mujeres engañadas (Deceived Women), and then a year later she worked on Amigas y rivales (Friends and Rivals).
In Hasta que el dinero nos separe, she plays Susana Hadad, a very spiritual vegetarian, who is the main character's secretary and best friend.

Filmography

References

1977 births
Living people
Mexican telenovela actresses
Actresses from Michoacán